The Bay of Bangkok, also known as the Bight of Bangkok, is the northernmost part of the Gulf of Thailand, roughly extending from Hua Hin District to the west and Sattahip District to the east. Three of the major rivers of central Thailand empty into the bay - the Chao Phraya and its distributary Tha Chin, the Mae Klong and the Bang Pakong River.

There are some islands off the eastern shores of the bay, like Ko Sichang, Ko Lan and Ko Phai.

Environment
The water quality of the Bay of Bangkok is rated as "very poor" by the Pollution Control Department.

References

 
Bays of Thailand
Gulf of Thailand